Bay Ridge High School was a school based in Bay Ridge, Brooklyn.  Initially the school was co educational, but when New Utrecht High School was formed it became an all girls high school.  It served as the sister school to Brooklyn Technical High School.  It was closed in 1985.

It later became High School of Telecommunication Arts and Technology.

Notable alumni
Fritzie Abadi, artist
Clara Bow, silent film actress

References

Defunct high schools in Brooklyn
Educational institutions in the United States with year of establishment missing
Former school buildings in the United States
Public high schools in Brooklyn